The Amsterdam Cobras are a rugby league football club based in Amsterdam, Netherlands. They compete in the Netherlands Rugby League Bond (NRLB) domestic competition called Dutch Rugby League Competition, as well as internationally. They finished third in the 2017 and 2019 Rotterdam Nines. In 2018 the Cobras won their first Championship after defeating the Den Haag Knights RLFC 29-28 in extra time.

See also

 Netherlands Rugby League Bond
 Netherlands national rugby league team

References

External links 

Rugby league in the Netherlands
Dutch rugby league teams
Rugby clubs established in 2014
2014 establishments in the Netherlands
Sports clubs in Amsterdam